Mazraat Al Toufah, also spelled Mazraat Et Teffah and Mazraat Et-Teffah,   is a village in Zgharta District, in the Northern Governorate of Lebanon.

The population is primarily Maronite Christian.

Notable people
Salma Hage, author and cook
 General Afif Saleh
 Marwan Khoury, singer.
 Colonel Joseph Ramia, was killed with president René Moawad.

References

External links
 Ehden Family Tree

Populated places in the North Governorate
Zgharta District
Maronite Christian communities in Lebanon